The 50th Street station was a station on the demolished IRT Sixth Avenue Line in Manhattan, New York City. It had two tracks and two side platforms. It was served by trains from the IRT Sixth Avenue Line and opened on June 5, 1878. It closed on December 4, 1938. The next southbound stop was 42nd Street. For some trains, the next northbound stop was 58th Street Terminal until 1924, while for other trains, the next northbound stop was Eighth Avenue. For express trains, the next northbound stop was 66th Street on Ninth Avenue. Two years later after the station closed, it was replaced by the nearby underground 47th–50th Streets–Rockefeller Center (IND Sixth Avenue Line) subway station.

References

IRT Sixth Avenue Line stations
Railway stations closed in 1938
Former elevated and subway stations in Manhattan
1938 disestablishments in New York (state)

Sixth Avenue
1878 establishments in New York (state)
Railway stations in the United States opened in 1878